Jean-Michel Joachim (born 3 May 1992) is a French footballer who plays for Moroccan club Club Rachad Bernoussi as a forward.

Career 
Joachim kicked off his career with French club Nancy with whom he made two appearances in Ligue 1 as a substitute in 2013. After a stint with Wiltz 71, he trialled with English EFL League Two Carlisle United in 2017. After a successful trial, he signed a professional  contract in March which would keep him in the club till the end of the season. He made his debut in a match against Mansfield Town.

After spending the entire 2017 preseason with National League club Kidderminster Harriers, Joachim signed a professional contract with the non-league club in the summer. In September, he switched clubs and countries, this time by penning a deal with Indian I-League club Chennai City.

13 February 2020, Jean-Michel Joachim engaged with the bahreini professional football team Busaiteen Club.

The 1st September 2022, after 2 years in Bahrein, he decided to engage in Morocco in the Moroccan club of Club Rachad Bernoussi

References

External links

1992 births
Living people
French footballers
French expatriate footballers
English Football League players
Ligue 1 players
Championnat National players
Championnat National 2 players
Championnat National 3 players
Luxembourg National Division players
I-League players
AS Nancy Lorraine players
US Boulogne players
FC Wiltz 71 players
Carlisle United F.C. players
Kidderminster Harriers F.C. players
Chennai City FC players
NEROCA FC players
Anagennisi Deryneia FC players
CO Les Ulis players
Busaiteen Club players
Association football forwards
French expatriate sportspeople in Luxembourg
French expatriate sportspeople in England
French expatriate sportspeople in India
French expatriate sportspeople in Cyprus
French expatriate sportspeople in Bahrain
Expatriate footballers in Luxembourg
Expatriate footballers in England
Expatriate footballers in India
Expatriate footballers in Cyprus
Expatriate footballers in Kuwait
Expatriate footballers in Bahrain
Al-Sahel SC (Kuwait) players
Kuwait Premier League players
French expatriate sportspeople in Kuwait